The coat of arms of Botswana was adopted on 25 January 1966. The centre shield is supported by two zebras. The shape of the shield is that of traditional shields found in Southern Africa. On the top portion of the shield are three cogwheels that represent industry.

The coat of arms is based on designs by Isabel Fawcus, whose husband Peter Fawcus was the Commissioner of Bechuanaland in 1960–65, and Shiela England.

The three waves symbolize water, and reminds the viewer of the motto of the nation: pula, which translates to "rain", but also good luck, and is also the name of the nation's currency. This motto also highlights the importance of water to Botswana. The motto is inscribed on a blue ribbon placed at the bottom of the coat of arms.

At the bottom of the shield is the head of a bull, which symbolises the importance of cattle herding in Botswana. The two zebras also symbolise the importance of wildlife, through tourism, in the national economy. Also, zebra have black and white stripes which represent equality of people of all colours in Botswana. The zebra on the right holds an ear of sorghum, an important crop in the nation. The zebra on the left holds a tusk of ivory, symbolic of the former ivory trade in Botswana. There is also a view that the ivory tusk represents wildlife preservation. Botswana has one of the highest elephant populations in Africa.

Official description (blazon)
The Botswana Emblems Act describes the coat of arms of Botswana as follows:

Argent three barrulets wavy in fesse Azure between in chief three cogwheels proper, one above engaged with two below and in base a bull's head caboshed proper, and for the supporters on either side a zebra the dexter supporting a white elephant's tusk the sinister a green stalk of sorghum and brown sorghum head with white grains proper. Motto "Pula" in black on a Botswana blue half tone scroll. The reverse side of the scroll is red.

Gallery

References 

 *Guide to the Flags of the World by Mauro Talocci, revised and updated by Whitney Smith, p. 165.

Botswana
National symbols of Botswana
Botswana
Botswana
Botswana
Botswana
Botswana
Botswana